Gary Fisketjon (born 1954) was an Editor and Vice-President of Knopf Publishing until his dismissal in May 2019.
Fisketjon created the Vintage Contemporaries line of paperbacks at Random House. He was the editorial director for the Atlantic Monthly Press from 1986 to 1990. Fisketjon joined Alfred A. Knopf in 1990 as editor-at-large.

Authors that Fisketjon has edited include Jay McInerney and Richard Ford.

References 

1954 births
Living people